The 2015–16 FA Youth Cup was the 64th edition of the FA Youth Cup.
Chelsea won the competition for the third year in a row.

Calendar

Qualifying rounds

Preliminary round

Notes:

First round qualifying

Notes:
 † = Tie ordered to be replayed

Second round qualifying

Third round qualifying

First round

Second round

Third round

Fourth round

Fifth round

Quarter-finals

Semi-finals

|}

First leg

Second Leg

Final

First leg

Second leg

See also
 2015–16 Professional U18 Development League
 2015–16 Under-21 Premier League Cup
 2015–16 FA Cup
 2015–16 in English football

References

External links
 The FA Youth Cup at The Football Association official website

FA Youth Cup seasons
FA
Fa Youth Cup, 2015-16